Yashar Aliyev may refer to:
 Yashar Aliyev (wrestler), an Azerbaijani freestyle wrestler
 Yashar Aliyev (diplomat), an Azerbaijani diplomat